Gillian Bevan (born 13 February 1956) is an English actress, best known for her roles in British television shows and West End theatre.

In 1988 she played Dorothy in the Royal Shakespeare Company's revival of their version of The Wizard of Oz, also singing the role on the cast album. She also appeared as parapsychologist Dr Lin Pascoe in the controversial BBC drama, Ghostwatch, on 31 October 1992.

She portrayed Gina Hope in the UK medical drama Holby City.  She played the wife of consultant Elliot Hope in the drama, who was struck with motor neuron disease.  Bevan's character made the decision to end her life by euthanasia in Switzerland, and her touching performance won critical acclaim.

She also played Clare Hunter, the headteacher in the UK TV Series Teachers.  Bevan has also appeared in other UK TV series, including: Heartbeat, Doctors, New Tricks and in the 1990s, Peak Practice, The Chief, and the BBC's drama Ghostwatch.

In 2016, she appeared in the BBC TV series Father Brown as Mrs Steele, episode 4.6 "The Rod of Asclepius"

She currently resides in the English countryside with her son, Jack Bailie.

Theatre performances
 Mrs Lovett in Sweeney Todd by Stephen Sondheim. Co-production with West Yorkshire Playhouse directed by James Brining at the Royal Exchange, Manchester. (2013) 
 Hera in The Last Days of Troy by Simon Armitage. Directed by Nick Bagnall at the Royal Exchange, Manchester. (2014)
 Polonia in Hamlet. Directed by Sarah Frankcom at the Royal Exchange, Manchester. (2014)
 Witch in Into the Woods by Stephen Sondheim. Directed by Matthew Xia at the Royal Exchange, Manchester. (2015)
 Jack's Mother in Into the Woods by Stephen Sondheim. Directed by Terry Gilliam and Leah Hausman at the Theatre Royal, Bath. (2022)

Discography
 Jerome Kern: Show Boat, conducted by John McGlinn, EMI 1988

References

External links

1956 births
English television actresses
English stage actresses
Living people
People from Stockport
20th-century English actresses
21st-century English actresses